The Regal was an American automobile produced by the Regal Motor Car Company of Detroit, Michigan, from 1907 to 1918.

History 
The Regal Motor Car Company of Detroit, Michigan was established in 1908 as a partnership between brothers Charles R., J. E. and Bert Lambert and Fred W. Haines. The Regal was a medium-sized and medium-priced automobile designed by Paul Arthur. The car was widely publicized and a factory stock 30-hp Regal nicknamed "Plugger" crossed the country 5 times in 1909 and 1910 covering 22,000 miles. Regal four-cylinder engines were their own design while automobile bodies came from the Fisher coachworks of Detroit.

Regal introduced an Underslung chassis model late in 1910 which added to its sporting image. In 1915 a V-8 engine and a light four-cylinder engine designed by S. G. Jenks were introduced that were manufactured by the Port Huron Construction Company.  Regal pricing was competitive, in 1911 pricing started at $900  for a Runabout to $1,650 for a Fore-Door Touring car.  Regal was among the leaders in U.S. automobile exporting.

Material shortages due to the First World War slowed production and Regal Motor Car Company ran out of operating funds.  In February 1918, creditors elected to liquidate the company.  The factory was purchased and kept open for a short while making spare parts.

Regal Britain 
In addition to American sales, from 1911 the cars were exported to Britain. The Seabrook Brothers who had a large automotive accessories business, branded the Regal as RMC and Seabrook-RMC for the British market.  The First World War interrupted the supply from Regal and Seabrook turned to importing Napoleon trucks for the war effort.

Regal Canada 
In 1910 an attempt was made to assemble the Regal across the river from Detroit in Walkersville, Ontario, Canada, but very few were made. 

Henry Nyberg who had made cars under his own name, and was involved with the Madison automobile, set up Canadian Regal Motors, Ltd in Berlin (later Kitchener, Ontario) in 1914.

The factory was the first in Canada to have a proper test track and test hill. It also had a club building with reading rooms, pool and dining rooms for factory workers with a separate one for white collar staff.

A 30-hp four-cylinder Regal and the V8 Regal were produced.  Local bodywork was used on the Regal components shipped from Detroit.  Between 200 and 400 cars were sold up to the end of 1916 when supply problems arose with the Detroit factory.  Due to World War I, Regal Motor Company in Detroit closed down.

Nyberg closed and sold the factory in 1918 and built another factory next door to build the Saxon automobile.  When this didn't happen, he made the Dominion unit, which converted cars into light trucks.

Advertisements

Models

Production 

Annual production totals

See also
 Regal automobiles at ConceptCarz
 Bonhams - 1911 Seabrook-RMC
 Detroit Public Library Collection - Regal Motor Car images
 Brass Era car
 List of defunct United States automobile manufacturers

References

Defunct motor vehicle manufacturers of the United States
Motor vehicle manufacturers based in Michigan
Defunct motor vehicle manufacturers of Canada
Brass Era vehicles
1900s cars
1910s cars